Ockert Wessel "Ockie" Oosthuizen (1 April 1955 – 3 December 2019) was a South African rugby player. He was capped nine times, scoring one try.

Rugby career
Oosterhuizen was born in Johannesburg. He first played for Western Transvaal (now known as the Leopards) as a 20-year-old in 1975, and later moved on to provincial giants Northern Transvaal (Blue Bulls) winning the Currie Cup in 1981 and Transvaal (Golden Lions). He made his international debut against Ireland in 1981 and was part of the ill-fated 1981 South Africa rugby union tour of New Zealand.

Oosthuizen quit rugby in 1985, as he was unhappy with the rugby administration at the time. Along with former Transvaal centre Dries Maritz, he tried to negotiate better financial advantages for their fellow players, which inevitably led to numerous clashes with the powers that be. He later had to appear in front of disciplinary committee after allegations of receiving payment for playing from the Rand Afrikaanse Universiteit (Rand Afrikaans University, now the University of Johannesburg). Although he won the case after an appeal, he was never selected for Transvaal again. He then briefly served as chairman of the now-defunct Randburg RFC, before getting fed up with the politics of the game.

Test history

Life after rugby
After his retirement from playing, he went into business and became chairman of a company specializing in financial services. In the early 1990s, he got involved in efforts to restart rugby league in South Africa.

See also
List of South Africa national rugby union players – Springbok no. 520
Rugby league in South Africa

References

Bibliography

External links
 Ockie Oosthuizen on espnscrum.com
 Ockie Oosthuizen at the Springbok Rugby Hall of Fame

1955 births
2019 deaths
South African rugby union players
South Africa international rugby union players
Afrikaner people
South African people of Dutch descent
Rugby union props
Rugby union players from Johannesburg
Blue Bulls players